The European Master in Law & Economics, also known as EMLE, is an Erasmus Mundus post-graduate master's degree. It focuses on "interdisciplinary studies of law and economics" and "an advanced understanding of the economic effects of divergent laws".

It is offered by a consortium of ten universities: Erasmus University Rotterdam (co-ordinating institution), University of Hamburg, Pompeu Fabra University (Barcelona), University of Ghent, University of Aix-Marseille, LUMSA University (Rome), University of Vienna, University of Haifa, Warsaw School of Economics, and the Indira Gandhi Institute of Development Research (Mumbai).

Students who participate in the EMLE Program usually divide their time between two or three of the participating Universities and, depending on their allocations, can receive multiple-degrees from each institution where they have undertaken studies. The partner universities variously award LL.M., M.Sc. or M.A. degrees. The language of instruction is English, but the master thesis can also be written in another European language.

History of the programme

The European Master Programme in Law and Economics started in 1990 at the University of Oxford, University of Ghent, Paris Dauphine University, and Erasmus University Rotterdam with 20 students from a variety of countries. From the very beginning, the Programme received recognition and financial support of the ERASMUS Bureau of the European Community. The partner universities exchanged multilateral agreements to continue their joint venture and made all the necessary arrangements in order to be included in the new SOCRATES framework between the European Commission and the European universities. The number of partner universities has increased rapidly and the network now comprises seven teaching centres within the EU and two internationally.

Admission

Admission to the EMLE is extremely selective. Applicants must have a bachelor's or master's degree in law or economics with high academic merit. Degrees from related disciplines are also acceptable, provided that the curriculum comprises a significant number of courses in law or economics. Preference is given to applicants who already have a first masters or above, and most admitted students already hold advanced degrees.  The demand for a place in the programme has steadily risen.  Given the increase in the number of applications, the acceptance rate is now consistently below 10%. While most students still come from within the E.U., over 30 other countries are represented in each class.

Structure

The European Master Programme in Law and Economics is the primary source of high quality postgraduate education in the field of the economic analysis of law. The EMLE is designed to provide students with advanced knowledge in the Economic Analysis of Law and to allow them to use economic methods to explain and assess the effects of divergent legal rules. Students study introductory courses and core courses on the major topics in the economic analysis of law.

Students also take specialized courses and write a master thesis. The EMLE includes three kinds of courses: Economic Courses, Comparative Law Courses, and Law and Economics Courses.

Students will become competent to work for private companies, public organizations, as economic advisers, or for large multinational law firms. Graduates are also well prepared for research in Law and Economics. Many EMLE graduates now hold teaching positions in European universities.

Reputation and accreditation

The EMLE has been recognized as an Erasmus Mundus Masters Course by a panel of independent academic experts and chosen by the Selection Committee out of 128 proposals. The European Commission has designated the programme of "outstanding academic quality." The Master in Law and Economics is the only Masters Course in Economics and one of the two Erasmus Mundus Courses in the legal discipline. In 2002, the EMLE Programme was already selected to take part in the Joint Masters Project of the European University Association (together with 10 other networks). In August 2004, the EMLE program in Rotterdam and Ghent was accredited by the NVAO, the Accreditation Organisation of the Netherlands and Flanders. Also in 2004, The EMLE was also included in the list of the eleven best European Joint Masters by the EUA. In February 2005, the EMLE was accredited by ZEvA, the German Central Evaluation and Accreditation Agency. The EMLE has participated in the TEEP II Project, which is a form of external quality assurance and The TEEP II Committee showed a very high appreciation of the EMLE. The Israeli economic newspaper Haaretz classified the EMLE programme as "the most elitist integrated Master program" for law and economics.

Governance

The EMLE is organized and governed by Associated Members and a Committee of Patronage, which is composed of public and private research institutions, governmental bodies, law firms and consulting firms, commercial enterprises, and renowned scholars in law and economics.

Associated Members include: Deutsche Bundesbank, Deutsche Bank AG, De Nederlandsche Bank, Ernst & Young, White & Case Deloitte,  Covington & Burling LLP, Centre for European Policy Studies, European Association of Law and Economics, RiskMetrics Group, Joseph von Sonnenfels Center for the Study of Public Law and Economics, Bombay Stock Exchange Limited, and many other notable institutions.

The Committee of Patronage includes world-leading Professors: James M. Buchanan (Nobel Prize Award 1985), Ronald Coase (Nobel Prize Award 1991), Robert Cooter (University of California, Berkeley), R. Epstein (University of Chicago), Michael Faure (University of Maastricht), William Landes (University of Chicago), Ejan Mackaay (University of Montréal), Henry Manne (former Dean - George Mason University Law School), A. Mitchell Polinsky (Stanford Law School), Richard Posner (University of Chicago, Chief Judge United States Court of Appeals for the Seventh Circuit), Susan Rose-Ackerman (Yale Law School), Steven Shavell (Harvard Law School), Cento Veljanovski (Research & Editorial Director of the Institute of Economic Affairs, London), Oliver E. Williamson (University of California, Berkeley), and O. Zerbe, Jr. (University of Washington).

The Midterm Meeting

The first Midterm Meeting of the EMLE took place in Ghent in 1991. Since then the Midterm Meeting of EMLE has grown to be a multi-facetted event, a symposium of lectures and scientific discussion seminars, informal networking and other social activities. This annual event now rotates between Rotterdam, Ghent, and Hamburg, and also serves as the forum for the EMLE graduation ceremonies. The EMLE Midterm Meeting attracts one of the largest groups of Law and Economics scholars in the world and is widely regarded as one of the leading conferences for law and economics.

References

External links
 European Master in Law & Economics
 Law & Economics LAB

College and university associations and consortia in Europe
Erasmus Mundus Programmes
Economics education
Law degrees
Master's degrees